Chrysaspis is a genus of beetles in the family Buprestidae, containing the following species:

 Chrysaspis armata Kerremans, 1891
 Chrysaspis auricauda Saunders, 1872
 Chrysaspis aurovittata (Saunders, 1867)
 Chrysaspis bennettii Waterhouse, 1904
 Chrysaspis cuneata Harold, 1878
 Chrysaspis cupreomicans Kerremans, 1895
 Chrysaspis elongata (Olivier, 1790)
 Chrysaspis glabra Waterhouse, 1904
 Chrysaspis higletti Waterhouse, 1904
 Chrysaspis ignipennis Harold, 1879
 Chrysaspis luluensis (Burgeon, 1941)
 Chrysaspis overlaeti (Burgeon, 1941)
 Chrysaspis propinqua Saunders, 1874
 Chrysaspis schoutedeni (Théry, 1926)
 Chrysaspis schultzei Kolbe, 1907
 Chrysaspis splendens (Nonfried, 1892)
 Chrysaspis tincta Waterhouse, 1904
 Chrysaspis viridipennis Saunders, 1869

References

Buprestidae genera